Anthony Karalius (19 September 1943 – 29 November 2019) was an English professional rugby league footballer who played in the 1960s, 1970s and 1980s. He played at representative level for Great Britain, and at club level for Widnes, St Helens, Wigan, Fulham RLFC and the Cardiff City Blue Dragons, as a  during the era of contested scrums.

Background
Tony Karalius was born in Widnes, Lancashire, England. He was of Lithuanian background. His surname means King in Lithuanian.

Playing career

International honours
Karalius won caps for Great Britain while at St. Helens in 1971 against New Zealand (3 matches), in 1972 against France, and in the 1972 Rugby League World Cup against New Zealand.

World Club Challenge Final appearances
Tony Karalius played  in St. Helens 2-25 defeat by the 1975 NSWRFL season premiers, Eastern Suburbs Roosters in the unofficial 1976 World Club Challenge at Sydney Cricket Ground on Tuesday 29 June 1976.

Challenge Cup Final appearances
Tony Karalius played  in St. Helens' 20-5 victory over Widnes in the 1976 Challenge Cup Final during the 1975–76 season at Wembley Stadium, London on Saturday 8 May 1976, and was an unused interchange/substitute in the 12-14 defeat by Leeds in the 1978 Challenge Cup Final during the 1977–78 season at Wembley Stadium, London on Saturday 13 May 1978, in front of a crowd of a crowd of 96,000.

County Cup Final appearances
Tony Karalius was an interchange/substitute, i.e. number 15, in St. Helens' 2-2 draw with Leigh in the 1967 Lancashire County Cup Final during the 1967–68 season at Station Road, Swinton on Saturday 7 October 1967, he did not play in the 13-10 victory over Warrington in the 1967 Lancashire County Cup Final replay during the 1967–68 season at Station Road, Swinton on Saturday 2 December 1967, and played  in the 4-7 defeat by Leigh in the 1970 Lancashire County Cup Final during the 1970–71 season at Station Road, Swinton on Saturday 28 November 1970.

BBC2 Floodlit Trophy Final appearances
Tony Karalius played  in St. Helens' 5-9 defeat by Leeds in the 1970 BBC2 Floodlit Trophy Final during the 1970-71 season at Headingley Rugby Stadium, Leeds on Tuesday 15 December 1970, played  in the 8-2 victory over Rochdale Hornets in the 1971 BBC2 Floodlit Trophy Final during the 1971-72 season at Headingley Rugby Stadium, Leeds on Tuesday 14 December 1971, played  in the 22-2 victory over Dewsbury in the 1975 BBC2 Floodlit Trophy Final during the 1975-76 season at Knowsley Road, St. Helens on Tuesday 16 December 1975, and played right-, i.e. number 12, in the 11-26 defeat by Hull Kingston Rovers in the 1977 BBC2 Floodlit Trophy Final during the 1977–78 season at Hilton Park, Leigh on Tuesday 13 December 1977.

Personal life
Tony Karalius was the younger brother of the rugby league footballer who played in the 1950s and 1960s for St. Helens, and Warrington; Denis/Dennis Karalius, and the St. Helens, and Widnes rugby league legend; Vince Karalius.

References

External links
!Great Britain Statistics at englandrl.co.uk (statistics currently missing due to not having appeared for both Great Britain, and England)
Profile at saints.org.uk
Statistics at wigan.rlfans.com

1943 births
2019 deaths
Cardiff City Blue Dragons players
English people of Lithuanian descent
English rugby league players
Great Britain national rugby league team players
Lancashire rugby league team players
London Broncos players
Rugby league hookers
Rugby league players from Widnes
St Helens R.F.C. players
Widnes Vikings players
Wigan Warriors players